Gianluca Pianegonda (born September 23, 1968 in Thiene) is a former Italian racing cyclist. His most notable result was winning stage 2 of the 1995 Vuelta a España. He also held the leader's jersey for one day.

Palmares

1986
1st Giro di Basilicata
1989
2nd Giro del Belvedere
1994
1st Gran Premio Palio del Recioto
1st Trofeo Gianfranco Bianchin
1st stage 8 Niedersachsen-Rundfahrt
1995
1st stage 1 Regio-Tour
1st stage 2 Vuelta a España
2nd Regio-Tour
3rd Grand Prix d'Ouverture La Marseillaise
1996
2nd Classic Haribo
3rd Brabantse Pijl
3rd Kuurne–Brussels–Kuurne
3rd Tirreno–Adriatico
1997
1st Brabantse Pijl
2nd Tirreno–Adriatico

References

1968 births
Living people
Italian male cyclists
Italian Vuelta a España stage winners
Cyclists from the Province of Vicenza
People from Thiene